Dorra Ibrahim Zarrouk (born 13 January 1980) is a Tunisian actress living in Egypt.

Early life 
Dorra was born in Tunis, her father was Ibrahim Zarrouk and her maternal grandfather, Ali Zouaoui, was an economist and politician.

Dorra had a Bachelor of Law at the Faculty of Law and Political Science of Tunis in 2001, then she had a Master of Advanced Studies in Political Science from the Saint Joseph University in Lebanon in 2003.

Career 
Despite her academic background, Dorra started performing in 1997, then acting on the Tunisian theater, with Taoufik Jebali in 2000. In 2002, Dorra's first act was at a Franco-Tunisian film, .

In 2003, she took part in the Colosseum: Rome's Arena of Death. Her first TV series outside Tunisia was in 2004, when she acted in Fares Bani Marwan in Syria. In the same year, she starred in Nadia et Sarra with Hiam Abbass.

In 2007, she started her career in Egypt, where she featured at Alawela fel Gharam and Heya Fawda with Menna Shalabi.

Later on, she acted in various films such as Al Mosafer, Tisbah Ala Khair and Sheikh Jackson.

Personal life 
Dorra was briefly engaged to a Tunisian businessman Qays Mukhtar in 2012. In April 2020, she posted pictures on social media dating an Egyptian businessman and interior designer, Hany Saad, whom she married in November 2020.

References

External links 

 
 

1980 births
Living people
Tunisian film actresses
Egyptian film actresses
Tunisian television actresses
Egyptian television actresses
People from Tunis
Saint Joseph University alumni
21st-century Tunisian actresses